Chiara e gli altri (Kate and the others) is an Italian television series directed by Andrea Barzini.

Cast

 Alessandro Haber: Paolo Malfatti
 Ottavia Piccolo: Livia Malfatti
 Morena Turchi: Chiara Malfatti
 Silvia Degli Espinosa: Lucilla Malfatti
 Andrea Giovagnoni: Marco Malfatti
 Galeazzo Benti: Grandpa Italo 
 Didi Perego: Grandma Lucia
 Carlo Monni: Franco

See also
List of Italian television series

External links
 

Italian television series

1989 Italian television series debuts
1991 Italian television series endings
1980s Italian television series
1990s Italian television series
Italia 1 original programming